Balfour v Balfour [1919] 2 KB 571 is a leading English contract law case. It held that there is a rebuttable presumption against an intention to create a legally enforceable agreement when the agreement is domestic in nature.

Facts
Mr. Balfour was a civil engineer, and worked for the Government as the Director of Irrigation in Ceylon (now Sri Lanka). Mrs Balfour was living with him. In 1915, they both came back to England during Mr Balfour's leave. But Mrs Balfour had developed rheumatoid arthritis. Her doctor advised her to stay in England, because the climate in Ceylon would be detrimental to her health. Mr Balfour's boat was about to set sail, and he orally promised her £30 a month until she came back to Ceylon. They drifted apart, and Mr Balfour wrote saying it was better that they remain apart. In March 1918, Mrs Balfour sued him to keep up with the monthly £30 payments. In July she got a decree nisi and in December she obtained an order for alimony.

At first instance, judge Charles Sargant held that Mr Balfour was under an obligation to support his wife.

Judgement
The Court of Appeal unanimously held that there was no enforceable agreement, although the depth of their reasoning differed. Warrington LJ delivered his opinion first, the core part being this passage.

Then Duke LJ gave his. He placed weight on the fact that the parties had not yet been divorced, and that the promise had been made still whilst as husband and wife.

Lord Justice Atkin took a different approach, emphasising that there was no "intention to affect legal relations". That was so because it was a domestic agreement between husband and wife, and it meant the onus of proof was on the plaintiff, Mrs Balfour. She did not rebut the presumption.

Significance
The case is often cited in conjunction with Merritt v Merritt [1970] 2 All ER 760; [1970] 1 WLR 1211.  Here the court distinguished the case from Balfour v Balfour on the fact that Mr and Mrs Merritt, although still married, were estranged at the time the agreement was made and therefore any agreement between them was made with the intention to create legal relations.  Both cases are often quoted examples of the principle of precedent.

See also

 Creating legal relations in English law
 Mechanisms of the English common law
Diwell v Farnes [1959] 1 WLR 624; [1959] 2 All ER 379; 
Gould v Gould [1970] 1 QB 275; [1969] 3 WLR 490; [1969] 3 All ER 728
Hoddinott v Hoddinott [1949] 2 KB 406
Jones v Padavatton [1969] 1 WLR 328; [1969] 2 All ER 616
Spellman v Spellman [1961] 1 WLR 921; [1961] 2 All ER 498
Merritt v Merritt [1970] 1 WLR 1211; [1970] 2 All ER 760
Robinson v Customs and Excise Commissioners [2000] Po LR 112; Times, April 28, 2000
Plate v Durst, 42 W.Va. 63, 66-67, 24 S.E. 580, 581, 32 LRA 404 (1896) defendant promised plaintiff £1000 and a diamond ring if she would remain his domestic servant for 10 years, and she did, but then he claimed the promise was only in jest. Held that there was a valid contract. "Jokes are sometimes taken seriously...  if such is the case, and thereby the person deceived is led to give valuable services in the full belief and expectation that the joker is in earnest, the law will also take the joker at his word, and give him good reason to smile."

Notes

Contract law
1919 in British law
English enforceability case law
Court of Appeal (England and Wales) cases
1919 in case law